A rift is a linear zone where the lithosphere is being pulled apart.

Chasm or The Chasm may also refer to:

Arts, entertainment, and media

Games
Chasm (video game), a 2018 video game released by Bit Kid, Inc.
Chasm: The Rift, a 1997 computer game released by GT Interactive

Music
Chasm (Delta-S album), 2005
Chasm (Ryuichi Sakamoto album), 2004
"Chasm" (song), a 2010 song by Flyleaf
The Chasm (band), a death metal band originally from Mexico City, Mexico

Other uses in arts, entertainment, and media
 The Chasm (novel), a 1947 novel by Victor Canning
Chasm City, a 2001 science fiction novel
"The Chasm" (Sliders), a television episode

Places
Chasm, British Columbia
Chasm Provincial Park, adjacent to Chasm, British Columbia
The Chasm, a feature of Sandymount, Otago Peninsula, New Zealand

Other uses

Abyss (religion)
Canyon or gorge
Chaos (cosmogony)